José Eduardo da Cunha Pacheco (born 4 February, 1971) is a Portuguese politician from the Azores. He is the president of the Chega party in the Azores, vice-president of the party at large and a deputy in the Legislative Assembly of the Azores. He was previously a deputy for the CDS - People's Party.

Pacheco joined the CDS-Azores in 2004 and was elected as a municipal councilor in Lagoa and later as a deputy in the Assembly. He subsequently switched his affiliation to Chega after meeting with Diogo Pacheco de Amorim who was head of regions for the party. For the 2020 Azorean regional election, Pacheco was placed first on the list for Chega and elected to the Assembly. In the same year, he was appointed chairman and leader of Chega in the Azores after the original leader Carlos Furtado quit the party. In 2022, Pacheco became a vice-president of Chega.

References

1971 births
Portuguese politicians
21st-century Portuguese politicians
Chega politicians
Members of the Legislative Assembly of the Azores
Living people
People from the Azores